is a professional Japanese baseball player. He plays outfielder for the Hokkaido Nippon-Ham Fighters.

External links

 NPB.com

1996 births
Living people
Baseball people from Tokyo
Japanese baseball players
Nippon Professional Baseball outfielders
Hokkaido Nippon-Ham Fighters players